The Zentrum für soziale Entwicklung und Selbsthilfe Perspektive (Center for Social Development and Self-Empowerment), founded in 1988, is a partner organisation of Russlandhilfe e.V. based in Moscow. 

Russlandhilfe e. V. was founded in Germany in 1990 by Ms. Anne S. Hofinga, as many people slipped into poverty after the collapse of the Soviet Union. The center is financed by donations from Germany, Austria and Switzerland.

Most of its projects focus on self-empowerment. Therefore, generally only projects are supported that will become sustainable and won’t be dependent on donations forever. Such projects are for example vocational training, tertiary education for orphans and vulnerable children with learning handicaps, and jobs for handicapped young adults. The center also facilitates networking between like institutions. 

Austrian civil conscripts are being sent to the center since 2001 by the Austrian Service Abroad.

See also
 Austrian Social Service
 Austrian Service Abroad

References

External links 
  Rußlandhilfe
  Österreichischer Sozialdienst

Social welfare charities